John Payne Guerin (October 31, 1939 – January 5, 2004) was an American percussionist. He was a proponent of the jazz-rock style.

Biography
Guerin was born in Hawaii and raised in San Diego. As a young drummer, he began performing with Buddy DeFranco in 1960. In the late 1960s, he moved to Los Angeles where his drum work was utilized by artists including Frank Sinatra, The Beach Boys, George Harrison, Frank Zappa, The Animals, Joni Mitchell, Them, Thelonious Monk, Lou Rawls, Ray Conniff, George Shearing, Peggy Lee, Ella Fitzgerald, Linda Ronstadt, Nelson Riddle, and many others.

From July 1972 to January 1973, he was the drummer for The Byrds and joined the L.A. Express later that year. The band served as Joni Mitchell's back-up band on tour during the mid- to late-1970s; Guerin had a brief relationship with Mitchell during that time. She later wrote the song Hejira about leaving him.

Guerin was an exponent of the jazz-rock style and played in many different genres, including for film and television. Among his contributions to motion picture and television scores, Guerin worked on the soundtrack to the 1988 film homage to Charlie Parker, Bird by Clint Eastwood. Those are also his drums on the theme song during the opening credits for the 1968 television series Hawaii Five-O.

In later years, Guerin worked with Oscar Peterson, Jon Faddis, Jimmy Heath, Ray Charles, Sonny Rollins, Justin Morell, Andreas Pettersson, David Basse, David Garfield, Gary Lemel, and Mike Melvoin.

Guerin died of heart failure on January 5, 2004, in West Hills, California.

Selected discography

As sideman 
With David Axelrod
 The Auction (Decca, 1972)
 Seriously Deep (Polydor, 1975)

With The Beach Boys
 20/20 (Capitol, 1969)
 Sunflower (Reprise, 1970)

With Michael Franks
 The Art of Tea (Reprise Records, 1976)
 Sleeping Gypsy (Warner Bros. Records, 1977)
 Blue Pacific (Reprise Records, 1990)

With Terry Garthwaite
 Terry (Arista, 1975)
 Hand in Glove (Fantasy, 1978)

With David Gates
 First (Elektra, 1973)
 Goodbye Girl (Elektra, 1978)

With Jack Jones
 Harbour (RCA Victor, 1974)
 What I Did For Love (RCA Victor, 1975)

With Peggy Lee
 Pass Me By (Capitol Records, 1965)
 Then Was Then – Now Is Now! (Capitol Records, 1965)
 Guitars a là Lee (Capitol Records, 1966)
 Make It With You (Capitol Records, 1970)
 Mirrors (A&M Records, 1975)
 Close Enough for Love (DRG, 1979)

With Melanie
 Photograph (Atlantic, 1976)
 Seventh Wave (Neighbourhood Records, 1983)

With Joni Mitchell
 Court and Spark (Asylum Records, 1974)
 The Hissing of Summer Lawns (Asylum Records, 1975)
 Hejira (Asylum Records, 1976)
 Don Juan's Reckless Daughter (Asylum Records, 1977)
 Wild Things Run Fast (Geffen, 1982)

With Oliver Nelson
 Black, Brown and Beautiful (Flying Dutchman, 1969)
 Zig Zag (Original Motion Picture Score) (MGM, 1970)

With Aaron Neville
 The Grand Tour (A&M Records, 1993)
 Aaron Neville's Soulful Christmas (A&M Records, 1993)

With Tom Pacheco
 The Outsider (RCA, 1976)
 Swallowed Up in the Great American Heartland (RCA Victor, 1976)

With Howard Roberts
 Spinning Wheel (Capitol Records, 1969)
 Antelope Freeway (Impulse!, 1971)

With Linda Ronstadt
 What's New (Asylum Records, 1983)
 Lush Life (Asylum Records, 1984)
 For Sentimental Reasons (Asylum Records, 1986)
 A Merry Little Christmas (Elektra Records, 2000)

With Diane Schuur
 Love Walked In (GRP, 1996)
 Music Is My Life (Atlantic, 1999)

With Seals and Crofts
 Summer Breeze (Warner Bros., 1972)
 Diamond Girl (Warner Bros., 1973)

With Bud Shank
 Magical Mystery (World Pacific, 1967)
 Let It Be (Pacific Jazz, 1970)

With Patrick Williams
 Wind, Sky and Diamonds (Impulse!, 1967)
 Threshold (Capitol Records, 1973)

With Frank Zappa
 Lumpy Gravy (Capitol, 1967)
 Hot Rats (Reprise, 1969)
 Chunga's Revenge (Reprise, 1970)
 Apostrophe (') (DiscReet, 1974)
 The Lost Episodes (Rykodisc, 1996)

With others
 Alessi Brothers, Alessi (A&M, 1976)
 Gene Ammons, Brasswind (Prestige, 1974)
 Eric Andersen, Be True To You (Arista, 1975)
 Hoyt Axton, Southbound (A&M Records, 1975)
 Joan Baez, Diamonds & Rust (A&M Records, 1975)
 Stephen Bishop, Careless (ABC, 1976)
 David Blue, Com'n Back for More (Asylum, 1975)
 Blue Mitchell, Blues' Blues (Mainstream, 1972)
 Elkie Brooks, Rich Man's Woman (A&M, 1975)
 Toni Brown, Toni Brown (Fantasy, 1979)
 The Byrds, Banjoman - The Original Soundtrack (recorded 1972, released Sire, 1977) (Various Artists, 2 live tracks by The Byrds)
 Keith Carradine, I'm Easy (Asylum, 1976)
 Natalie Cole, Stardust (Elektra Records, 1996)
 Priscilla Coolidge and Booker T. Jones, Chronicles (A&M Records, 1973)
 Sheena Easton, No Strings (MCA Records, 1993)
 Cass Elliot, Cass Elliot (RCA, 1972)
 Don Ellis, Haiku (MPS, 1974)
 José Feliciano, Como Tú Quieres (RCA Victor, 1984)
 Art Garfunkel, Breakaway (Columbia Records, 1975)
 Cyndi Grecco, Making Our Dreams Come True (Private Stock Records, 1976)
 George Harrison, Dark Horse (Apple Records, 1974)
 Monk Higgins, Extra Soul Perception (Solid State, 1968)
 Elton John, Duets (Rocket, 1993)
 John Klemmer, Touch (ABC, 1975)
 Leah Kunkel, I Run With Trouble (Columbia, 1980)
 Patti LaBelle, This Christmas (MCA, 1990)
 Dave Loggins, Apprentice (In a Musical Workshop) (Epic, 1974)
 Barry Mann, Barry Mann (Casablanca Records, 1980)
 Bobby McFerrin, Bobby McFerrin (Elektra, 1982)
 Roger McGuinn, Roger McGuinn (Columbia, 1973)
 Liza Minnelli, Gently (Angel Records, 1996)
 Walter Murphy, Rhapsody in Blue (Private Stock, 1977)
 Anne Murray, Together (Capitol, 1975)
 Harry Nilsson, Harry (RCA Victor, 1969)
 The Oak Ridge Boys, Room Service (ABC, 1973)
 Gram Parsons, GP (Reprise Records, 1973)
 Bonnie Raitt, The Glow (Warner Bros. Records, 1979)
 Helen Reddy, Helen Reddy (Capitol Records, 1971)
 Della Reese, Let Me in Your Life (LMI, 1973)
 Kenny Rogers, Timepiece (Atlantic Records, 1994)
 Buffy Sainte-Marie, Sweet America (ABC, 1976)
 Tom Scott, Rural Still Life (Impulse!, 1968)
 J. D. Souther, Black Rose (Asylum Records, 1976)
 Barbra Streisand, Butterfly (Columbia Records, 1974)
 Gábor Szabó, Light My Fire with Bob Thiele (Impulse!, 1967)
 Valdy, Landscapes (Haida, 1975)
 Sarah Vaughan, Sarah Vaughan with Michel Legrand (Mainstream Records, 1973)

References

External links

1939 births
2004 deaths
Musicians from Hawaii
American country rock musicians
The Byrds members
Musicians from Los Angeles
American rock drummers
American jazz drummers
American country drummers
American session musicians
20th-century American drummers
American male drummers
American male jazz musicians
Muleskinner (band) members
L.A. Express members
20th-century American male musicians